David Priestland is a British historian. He teaches modern history at the University of Oxford and is Fellow of St Edmund Hall.

Career

Priestland's research focuses on the history of the Soviet Union and the development of communism and neoliberalism. He is an occasional political and cultural commentator for The Guardian and New Statesman. In 2013, Priestland published a book Merchant, Soldier, Sage: A History of the World in Three Castes, which focuses mainly on a power struggle between three castes fighting for domination within society. Priestland's main argument is that humanity has shifted from societies oriented towards a warrior-class, through periods of sage dominance into a modern hegemony of merchants, which has culminated in dominance by businesspeople and billionaire entrepreneurs. In the book, Priestland's voice is mostly critical of global capitalism, which has attracted some notable criticism from other academics.

Selected works 
 Stalinism and the politics of mobilization: ideas, power, and terror in inter-war Russia. Oxford: Oxford University Press, 2007
 The Red Flag. Allen Lane 2009,  (The three English-language editions 2009-2010 each have different subtitles: How Communism Changed The World; Communism and the Making of the Modern World; A History of Communism)
 World History of Communism. From the French Revolution to today. Translated by Klaus-Dieter Schmidt. Siedler, Munich 2009, 
 World History of Communism. Federal Agency for Civic Education, Bonn .
 Russian edition:  Красный флаг . история коммунизма, Krasnyi flag: Istorija kommunizma, ЭКСМО / EKSMO, Moskva 2011
 Merchant, soldier, sage: a history of the world in three castes. New York: Penguin Press, 2013

References

External links
 Priestland's profile at St Edmund Hall
 Priestland's profile at the University of Oxford Faculty of History

Living people
Year of birth missing (living people)
British historians
Fellows of St Edmund Hall, Oxford
Historians of communism